Ekallatum (Akkadian: 𒌷𒂍𒃲𒈨𒌍, URUE2.GAL.MEŠ, Ekallātum, "the Palaces") was an ancient Amorite city-state and kingdom in upper Mesopotamia. The exact location of it has not yet been identified, but it is thought to be located somewhere along the left bank of the Tigris, south of Assur. A tablet fragment was found at Tel Hazor which listed an expected trade path from Hazor to Mari and then on to Ekallatum.

Ekallatum, whose name means "the palaces," became the capital of an Amorite dynasty related to Babylon, which was important in the 19th and 18th centuries BCE period. The history of upper Mesopotamia in this period is documented in the archives of Mari, Syria.

History
Its first known king was Ila-kabkabu, who seems to have entered into a conflict with Iagitlim of Mari. His son Shamshi-Adad I ascended to the throne around 1810 BCE, continuing the conflict and attempting to extend into the valley along the Khabur River. His expansion was halted by Iagitlim's son, Iakhdunlim, and he was soon after defeated by Naram-Sin of Assyria, which caused him to flee to Babylon, a city founded and ruled by fellow Amorites.  He returned upon Naram-Sin's death. Soon thereafter, a series of military victories by Shamshi-Adad followed, and he seized all of Upper Mesopotamia, founding what historians now call the Kingdom of Higher Mesopotamia. He founded his own capital at Shubat-Enlil, entrusting Ekallatum to his elder son Ishme-Dagan I. (His other son, Yasmah-Adad, was placed on the throne of Mari at the time.) Ishme-Dagan appears to have been a capable military leader, but when his father died in around 1775, he proved unable to maintain the whole kingdom; nonetheless, he kept Ekallatum, while his brother lost Mari and was killed.

The reign of Ishme-Dagan was chaotic. Unable to restore power to the city despite his many attempts, he was the target of nearby warlords, in particular, Zimrilim of Mari. When the Elamites took Ekallatum in 1765, he sought refuge with his traditional ally -- Hammurabi of Babylon—who helped him take back the throne. Consequently, Ekallatum became a vassal city subservient to the king of Babylon, who came to control all of Mesopotamia. With the death of Ishme-Dagan, his son Mut-Ashkur succeeded him. He was the last known king of Ekallatum, and the city disappeared thereafter from Mesopotamian history.

An inscription claims that the king of Babylon Marduk-nadin-ahhe (1095–1078 BC) captured Ekallātum. 

The Neo-Assyrian king Sennacherib (705 BC - 681 BC) claimed to "returned Adad and Shala to Ekallātum after 418 years had passed since the gods had left the city".

See also
Cities of the ancient Near East

References

Former populated places in Southwest Asia